Žiar is a mountain range in the Trenčín Region of northwestern Slovakia, part of the ranges of the Fatra-Tatra Area of the Inner Western Carpathians.

The chain stretches from the northwest to southeast in a curved arc 30 kilometers long and 5 to 7 kilometers wide.  Almost completely forested, the highest point of the range is Chlieviská (1024 meters), in the northern part of the group.

Mountain ranges of Slovakia
Mountain ranges of the Western Carpathians